Acianthera aechme is a species of orchid plant native to Ecuador.

References 

aechme
Flora of Ecuador
Plants described in 2001
Taxa named by Mark Wayne Chase